NewsOne or News 1 or variation, may refer to:

 News One, an Urdu-language Karachi-based Pakistani news channel started in November 2007
 NewsOne, an American online news website by Urban One which targets an African-American audience
 ABC News One, a video service of ABC News, an American news media company
 CTV News1, Canadian cable news channel
 NewsOne (Ukrainian TV channel), a former Ukrainian TV news channel
 News1, Israeli news website
 NEWS1, Thai news channel, see List of television stations in Thailand

See also

 NewsON
 
 
 
 
 One News (disambiguation)
 News (disambiguation)
 One (disambiguation)